Webb Township is an inactive township in Reynolds County, in the U.S. state of Missouri.

Webb Township was erected in 1845, taking its name from the local Webb family.

References

Townships in Missouri
Townships in Reynolds County, Missouri